Nadezhda Sugako (born 9 February 1964) is a Soviet rower. She competed in the women's eight event at the 1988 Summer Olympics.

References

1964 births
Living people
Soviet female rowers
Olympic rowers of the Soviet Union
Rowers at the 1988 Summer Olympics
Place of birth missing (living people)